Young Divas is the debut studio album by Australian girl group Young Divas, released on 14 November 2006 by Sony BMG. The group was initially formed for a one-off single and national tour to promote all members as solo artists. However, following the success of their debut single "This Time I Know It's for Real" and the tour, Sony BMG decided that the Young Divas would record a full-length album of classic disco and pop covers. The album debuted at number four on the ARIA Albums Chart and was certified double platinum by the Australian Recording Industry Association (ARIA), for shipments of 140,000 copies.

A cover of Donna Summer's "This Time I Know It's for Real" was released as the lead single from the album in May 2006. The song peaked at number two on the ARIA Singles Chart and was certified platinum. The second single, a cover of Lonnie Gordon's "Happenin' All Over Again", was released in November 2006. It peaked at number nine and was certified gold. A cover of Hazell Dean's "Searchin'" was released as the album's third and final single in March 2007, and peaked at number 40.

Track listing

Charts and certifications

Weekly chart

Year-end charts

Certification

Release history

References

2006 debut albums
Young Divas albums
Covers albums
Sony Music Australia albums
House music albums by Australian artists